Falta Amor (English: Love Is Missing) is the fourth studio album  by Latin American Mexican rock band Maná, their second under the name Maná, and their first under the WEA Latina label. The album had sold almost 500,000 copies worldwide by 1993, and following their 1994 breakthrough in the United States, Falta Amor had sold 186,000 copies in the country by 2011.

Reception

Jason Birchmeier of AllMusic stated that "Falta Amor is the Mexican pop/rock band's least noteworthy album by far – musically, at least – but it still has its moments".

Track listing

Personnel
Maná
Fher Olvera – lead vocals, acoustic guitar, harmonics, choir
Alex González – drums, percussion, lead vocals on "Buscándola", choir
Juan Diego Calleros – bass
Ulises Calleros – electric guitar, acoustic guitar, choir
Iván González – synthesizers, acoustic piano and hammond organ

Charts

References

1990 albums
Maná albums
Warner Music Latina albums